Youth Without Youth is a 2007 fantasy drama film written, produced, and directed by Francis Ford Coppola, based on the novella of the same name by Romanian author Mircea Eliade. The film is a co-production between the United States, Romania, France, Italy and Germany. It was the first film that Coppola had directed in ten years, since 1997's The Rainmaker.

The film opens in 1938, with an elderly Romanian professor contemplating suicide. He is struck by lightning, and consequently finds himself rejuvenated. He subsequently develops psychic powers, which attract the attention of Nazi agents. He flees to Switzerland, where he meets a reincarnation of his past lover. He discovers information both about her various past incarnations, and about the evolutionary potential of humanity.

The film premiered at the 2007 Rome Film Festival. It was distributed through Sony Pictures Classics in the United States (where it was released on December 14, 2007) and by Pathé Distribution in France. The music was composed by Argentinian classical composer Osvaldo Golijov. In an interview, Coppola said that he made the film as a meditation on time and on consciousness, which he considers a "changing tapestry of illusion", but he stated that the film may also be appreciated as a beautiful love story, or as a mystery.

Plot

In 1938, Dominic Matei is a 70-year-old professor of linguistics. He is pining after the love of his youth, Laura. He subsequently travels to Bucharest, the city where he and she met at university. Feeling that his fruitless search for the origin of human language has condemned him to a solitary, wasted life, Dominic is intent on committing suicide after this one last journey. However, he is abruptly yet non-lethally struck by lightning while crossing the street. In hospital, Professor Stanciulescu informs Dominic that, much to both their surprises, the lightning appears to have regenerated him into a much younger man. Soon after, while residing at the Professor's home, Dominic also discovers that he possesses strange, psychic capacities.

As Romania is invaded by Nazi Germany, Doktor Josef Rudolf begins to show an interest in Stanciulescu's miracle patient. Since Dominic's budding powers have blurred his perception of reality, he is bamboozled into mistaking a Nazi spy known only as the Woman in Room Six for an erotic fantasy. They spend their nights together, and she discovers that he has developed a talent for speaking in tongues. Meanwhile, invisible to human eyes, an alternate persona presents itself to Dominic as his "Other" from outside space and time. When Dominic asks for proof, the "Other" obliges by bringing him two roses out of nowhere. Unbeknownst to Dominic, Stanciulescu has witnessed the event and overhears his friend ask himself, "Where do you want me to put the third rose?" Understanding the Nazis' designs, Stanciulescu persuades Dominic to escape from Romania.

Living like a spy, Dominic eventually winds up in Switzerland towards the end of World War II. There he is confronted by Doktor Rudolf at gunpoint in an alleyway. Rudolf argues that Dominic's existence supports the Nazis' ideal of the superman, and that the coming nuclear conflicts can only be survived by a superior species of man. In the background, the "Other" confirms this to be the case. However, in refusing to cooperate, Dominic manifests telekinetic powers which manipulate Rudolf into shooting himself. Subsequently, Dominic returns to a normal existence and resumes his linguistic research. Having realised that the lightning strike has partially lent him the capacities and knowledge of future humanity, he develops a secret language for his audio diary, to be deciphered long after the nuclear apocalypse.

Many years later, Dominic encounters a woman named Veronica while hiking in the Alps. The "Other" reveals her to be the reincarnation of Laura. When the mountains are hit by a violent thunderstorm, Dominic rushes to her rescue and finds her chanting in Sanskrit, which he greets her with to gain her trust. During her stay in hospital, Veronica now identifies herself as "Rupini", one of the first disciples of the Buddha. Suspecting she may now be afflicted with a condition similar to his own, Dominic calls the Roman College of Oriental Studies for aid. Its representatives inform him that Rupini's last act in life was to retire into a cave for meditation on enlightenment. Since the cave's location is unknown, the scholars, led by Professor Giuseppe Tucci, agree to fund an expedition to find it in India. They hope that Veronica's past self will guide them. The venture proves a success when a local Boddhisatva recognises "Rupini" and directs her to the place of meditation. Following this discovery, Veronica becomes herself again and falls for Dominic.

The couple elope to Malta, where for a time, they live happily together. Dominic eventually tells Veronica in her sleep that he has always loved her. This causes Veronica to writhe in bed as if possessed. She begins chanting in a language which he does not understand. The "Other" explains that she is speaking in the ancient Egyptian language, having travelled further back along the path of her past selves. For the next two weeks, Dominic learns how to control this state in Veronica. He leads her to regress ever further in time and to speak previously unknown tongues. However, Veronica's health begins to decline from exhaustion. Dominic declares that he cannot continue these sessions, or even remain close to Veronica. His proximity to her is accelerating her age. Over the objections of both Veronica and the "Other", he leaves.

Despairing, Dominic returns to the town where he taught as a professor. His alter ego appears to him in a mirror and reveals the future of mankind.  Nuclear warfare will unleash an electromagnetic pulse, giving birth to a new, and powerful human species. Dominic is this species' first member. Veronica symbolised the dawn of man, and he stood for the dusk. Outraged at the idea of sacrificing millions of lives in the name of evolution, Dominic shatters the mirror. Without the mirror, the "Other" vanishes. In its final moments, it yells incoherently in an unfamiliar language. In the morning, townsfolk find Dominic's body, lying dead at the bottom of a staircase. As Veronica's voice is heard echoing "Where do you want me to put the third rose?", the rose appears in Dominic's lifeless grasp.

Cast
Tim Roth as Dominic Matei
Alexandra Maria Lara as Laura, Veronica
Bruno Ganz as Professor Stanciulescu
André Hennicke as Josef Rudolf
Marcel Iureș as Professor Giuseppe Tucci
Adrian Pintea as Pandit
Matt Damon (uncredited) as Ted Jones, a reporter for Life magazine
Alexandra Pirici as the woman in Room 6

Soundtrack 
The film's soundtrack was composed by Osvaldo Golijov

Release 
The film was released on October 26, 2007 in Italy. The original runtime was 210 minutes, then cut down to 170, then cut down to 140 minutes, Walter Murch then cut it down to the desired 124 minutes. It was released on Blu-ray and DVD on May 13, 2008.

Reception

Box office
Youth Without Youth grossed $244,397 in North America and $2.4 million in other countries for a worldwide total of $2.6 million.

Critical response
, the film holds a 32% approval rating on the review aggregator Rotten Tomatoes, based on 106 reviews with an average rating of 4.80/10. The site's critical consensus reads, "Although visually appealing, Coppola's latest film mixes too many genres with a very confusing plot." On Metacritic, the film has a weighted average score of 43 out of 100, based on 29 critics, indicating "mixed or average reviews". The New York Times gave it high praise, writing, "In this film Mr. Coppola blurs dreams and everyday life and suggests that through visual and narrative experimentation he has begun the search for new ways of making meaning, new holy places for him and for us.". Variety, however, was "disappointed" by the "mishmash plotting" and "stilted script". Rex Reed panned the film, writing, "You know a movie is doomed when the only star in it is Tim Roth. You know it's pretentious when the ads print the logo backward and upside down. Not one word of this bilge makes one lick of sense, and it is two hours and six minutes long. The only way to survive Youth Without Youth is dead drunk." Roger Ebert of the Chicago Sun-Times gave the film one-and-a-half out of four stars, stating that "[t]here is such a thing as a complex film that rewards additional viewing and study, but "Youth Without Youth," I am afraid, is no more than it seems: a confusing slog through metaphysical murkiness."

In 2016, Scout Tafoya of RogerEbert.com included the film in his video series "The Unloved", where he highlights films which received mixed to negative reviews that he believes to have artistic value. He stated that Coppola "made a film he would have wanted to see, with energy borrowed from his heroes. But this film is all him, really. What other major American director would throw out studio money just to scamper around Europe re-living the years of his father's prime? .... I saw the human struggling to change the world through his work, and the ways in which he failed himself, and I felt for him."

The film was nominated for Best Cinematography at the 23rd Independent Spirit Awards.

References

External links

2007 films
2000s fantasy drama films
American fantasy drama films
Romanian fantasy drama films
French fantasy drama films
Italian fantasy drama films
2000s English-language films
English-language Romanian films
English-language French films
English-language Italian films
English-language German films
Akkadian language
German fantasy drama films
2000s German-language films
2000s French-language films
2000s Italian-language films
2000s Russian-language films
2000s Romanian-language films
2000s Mandarin-language films
Latin-language films
Armenian-language films
Egyptian-language films
Constructed languages
Films directed by Francis Ford Coppola
Films with screenplays by Francis Ford Coppola
Films set in Bucharest
Films set in Uttar Pradesh
Films about language
Films about writers
Films based on Romanian novels
Films based on works by Mircea Eliade
Films produced by Francis Ford Coppola
Films set in 1938
Films set in Malta
Films set in Switzerland
Films shot in Romania
American nonlinear narrative films
American Zoetrope films
Films about Buddhism
Films about reincarnation
Madhyamaka
Metaphysical fiction films
American World War II films
French World War II films
German World War II films
Italian World War II films
Romanian World War II films
Films about psychic powers
Films shot in Bulgaria
2007 drama films
Films about rapid human age change
Films set in the Alps
2007 multilingual films
American multilingual films
French multilingual films
German multilingual films
Romanian multilingual films
2000s American films
2000s French films
2000s German films